Stepan Germanovich Krivov (born 20 March 1990) is a Russian former professional ice hockey player. He played in the Kontinental Hockey League (KHL) for HC Lada Togliatti and HC CSKA Moscow.

External links

1990 births
Living people
HC Astana players
HC CSK VVS Samara players
HC CSKA Moscow players
Krasnaya Armiya (MHL) players
HC Lada Togliatti players
HK Partizan players
Russian ice hockey defencemen
HC Sarov players
Sportspeople from Tolyatti